Dalibor Škorić (born 9 September 1971) is a Serbian former footballer who played as a midfielder.

Career
After starting out at his hometown club Dinara, Škorić played for Mogren in the 1991–92 Yugoslav Second League. He also played for Rudar Pljevlja, before joining Partizan in 1993.

Between 1995 and 1997, Škorić had two successful seasons with Rad, earning himself a transfer to Red Star Belgrade. He helped the team win the FR Yugoslavia Cup in the 1998–99 season.

In the 2000 winter transfer window, Škorić moved abroad and joined Chinese club Dalian Shide. He also played professionally in Cyprus (APOEL) and Hungary (MTK Budapest).

Honours
Red Star Belgrade
 FR Yugoslavia Cup: 1998–99

References

External links
 
 

1971 births
Living people
Sportspeople from Knin
Serbs of Croatia
Yugoslav footballers
Serbia and Montenegro footballers
Serbian footballers
Association football midfielders
FK Mogren players
FK Rudar Pljevlja players
FK Partizan players
FK Rad players
Red Star Belgrade footballers
Dalian Shide F.C. players
APOEL FC players
MTK Budapest FC players
First League of Serbia and Montenegro players
Chinese Super League players
Cypriot First Division players
Nemzeti Bajnokság I players
Serbia and Montenegro expatriate footballers
Expatriate footballers in China
Expatriate footballers in Cyprus
Expatriate footballers in Hungary
Serbia and Montenegro expatriate sportspeople in China
Serbia and Montenegro expatriate sportspeople in Cyprus
Serbia and Montenegro expatriate sportspeople in Hungary